Ernest Bernard Malley (26 May 1897 – 25 March 1957) was an Irish republican and writer. After a sheltered upbringing, he witnessed and participated in the Easter Rising of 1916, an event that changed his outlook fundamentally. O'Malley soon joined the Irish Volunteers before leaving home in spring 1918 to become an IRA training officer during the Irish War of Independence against British rule in Ireland. In the later period of that conflict, he was appointed a divisional commander with the rank of general. Subsequently, O'Malley strongly opposed the Anglo-Irish Treaty and became assistant chief of staff of the Anti-Treaty IRA during the Irish Civil War of 1922–23.

He wrote two memoirs, On Another Man's Wound and The Singing Flame, and two histories, Raids and Rallies and Rising-Out: Seán Connolly of Longford covering his early life, the War of Independence and the civil war period. These published works, in addition to his role as a senior leader on the losing side in the civil war, mark him as a primary source in the study of early twentieth-century Irish history and society. O'Malley also interviewed 450 people who participated in the war of independence and the civil war. Much of the evidence he gathered from them represents the activities and opinions of the ordinary soldier. By the time of his death in 1957, he had become a "deeply respected military hero".

Although he was elected, against his wishes, to Dáil Éireann in 1923 while in prison, O'Malley eschewed politics. As an Irish republican, he saw himself primarily as a soldier who had "fought and killed the enemies of our nation".

Early life
O'Malley was born in Castlebar, County Mayo, on 26 May 1897. His was a lower-middle class Catholic family in which he was the second of eleven children born to local man Luke Malley and his wife Marion (née Kearney) from Castlereagh, County Roscommon. The family's storytelling governess also lived with them in Ellison Street. The house was opposite a Royal Irish Constabulary (RIC) barracks.

O'Malley noted the importance of the police and that officers would nod in courtesy when his father walked by. As a child, he often visited the barracks and was given a tour of it. He also remembered RIC men dressed in suits leaving the town to keep peace at Orange parades in the North.

Although O'Malley heard of prominent political names like Parnell and Redmond at the dinner table, his parents never spoke of Ireland to him and his siblings. It was as if "nationality did not exist to disturb or worry normal life" in Castlebar, which he called a "shoneen town", meaning "a little John Bull town". Still, he was able to learn a little bit of Irish. O'Malley's father was a solicitor's clerk with conservative Irish nationalist politics: he supported the Irish Parliamentary Party. Priests dined with the family and they had privileged seats at Mass. The family spent the summer at Clew Bay, where O'Malley developed a lifelong love of the sea. He recounts meeting an old woman who, prophetically, spoke of fighting and trouble in store for him.

Dublin 
The Malleys moved to Dublin in 1906 when Ernie was still a boy. The 1911 census lists them living at 7 Iona Drive, Glasnevin. His father obtained a post with the Congested Districts Board and later became a senior civil servant. Joseph Devlin, the Belfast nationalist MP, visited O'Malley's CBS school in North Richmond St and made a very favourable impression on the boy. O'Malley was later to win a scholarship to study medicine at University College Dublin (UCD).

However, he was less impressed by the visit of King Edward VII to Dublin in July 1907, when he was aged ten, noting that he "didn't like the English" and spelt "king" with a small letter. O'Malley heard James Larkin and James Connolly speak during the great Dublin lock-out of 1913–1914. He witnessed heavy violence by the police and was in favour of the strikers' cause. He also observed the Irish Citizen Army drilling and was at Skerries when the Howth gun-running incident occurred in July 1914.

His older brother, Frank, and next younger brother, Albert, joined the Dublin Fusiliers in the British Army at the outbreak of World War I. O'Malley saw Prime Minister H. H. Asquith in Dublin, where he had come to urge Irishmen to do their bit for the war effort. He was initially indifferent to the Irish Citizen Army and the Irish Volunteers, whom he had observed drilling in the mountains. At that time, O'Malley was planning to join the British Army, like his friends and brothers.

In August 1915, he saw the body of veteran Irish Republican Jeremiah O'Donovan Rossa lying in state and witnessed the funeral procession.

Revolutionary career

Easter Rising and Irish Volunteers
O'Malley was in his first year of studying medicine at University College Dublin (UCD) when the Easter Rising occurred in April 1916. He recalls that, on Easter Monday, he read the Proclamation of the Republic at the base of Nelson's Pillar. Of the leaders of the new “Provisional Government of the Irish Republic”, O'Malley had previously met Tom Clarke and Thomas MacDonagh. 

O'Malley was almost persuaded by some anti-Rising friends to join them in defending Trinity College Dublin against the rebels should they attempt to take it. In On Another Man's Wound, O'Malley writes that he was offered the use of a rifle if he would return later and assist them. On his way home, he encountered an acquaintance who observed that O'Malley would be shooting fellow Irishmen, for whom he had no hatred, if he took that rifle. However, O'Malley recalls that his main feeling was one of mere annoyance at the inconvenience the fighting was causing. O'Malley kept a diary of what he saw during the Rising, including looting.

After some thought, he decided that his sympathies lay with the nationalists: only Irish people had the right to settle Irish questions. Therefore, he and a friend fired at British troops with a Mauser rifle provided by Conradh na Gaeilge. The resentment O'Malley felt at the shooting by firing squad of three of the signatories to the proclamation turned to rage at the execution in early May of John MacBride, whom he also knew from visits to the family home.

Soon after the rising, O'Malley became deeply involved in Irish republican activism. In August 1916, he had been invited to join the Irish Volunteers, Dublin 4th Battalion, which operated south of the River Liffey. However, because that battalion was quite a distance away, some time after Christmas 1916 he became a member of the 1st Battalion, F Company, because its base north of the Liffey was much closer to the family home. Later he was assigned to signals. From only 12 men in 1916, that company grew steadily during 1917 and 1918. Frank McCabe was the company captain.

O'Malley was unable to come and go freely from the family home, to which he was not given a key. On account of that and his medical studies, he found it difficult to be on parade punctually and had to refuse NCO training. His three younger brothers helped keep his activities quiet, but older brother Frank, now a British army officer of whom he was very fond, knew nothing about his brother's nationalist leanings.

F Company engaged in drilling and parades from its secret drill hall at 25 Parnell Square; sometimes senior figures from the battalion staff were present. In order to acquire a firearm, O'Malley donned his brother's British Army uniform to obtain a firearm permit and purchase a Smith and Wesson .38 revolver and ammunition. 

Later, he paid £4, a considerable sum, for his own rifle, a Lee-Enfield .303, which he hid in his bedroom. During a baton charge in Westmoreland Street, O'Malley and his colleagues knocked over a policeman and ran off with his baton. In the second half of 1917, he joined Conradh na Gaeilge.

Field organiser
O'Malley was finding it increasingly difficult to hide his activities from his parents, who queried the motives of the Irish Volunteers. Eventually, In early March 1918, he left both his studies and the family home and he went on the run, working full-time for the Irish Volunteers, later called the IRA. It would be more than three years until he would see his family again.

At the time he became attached to GHQ Organisational Staff under Michael Collins, there were not more than ten people who could work full-time for the Volunteers. O'Malley was given no explicit orders; instead, he was largely left to his own devices in organising rural brigades. This duty brought him to at least 18 brigade areas around Ireland. On one occasion he attended a meeting of the Ulster Volunteer Force in Derry City for intelligence gathering but picked up nothing.

GHQ first dispatched O'Malley to assistant chief of staff, Richard Mulcahy, at Dungannon, County Tyrone. He was appointed second lieutenant in charge of the Coalisland district.

In May 1918, Collins sent him to organise a brigade in County Offaly and hold elections. He arguably escaped capture or death when stopped by an RIC patrol in Philipstown, in the same county, and narrowly avoided having to draw a concealed pistol.

From Athlone, where he was planning to seize the magazine fort, an order from Collins in July sent him to help organise brigades in north and south Roscommon on the border with Galway. The police sought to arrest him and he was twice fired on and wounded. He crossed again to Roscommon and went to ground in the mountains. Using field glasses, O'Malley spied on the Lord Lieutenant, Lord French, at Rockingham House. This could have been hazardous in view of the strong British presence in nearby Carrick-on-Shannon. Night drilling continued in near silence behind village schoolhouses, but the secret organising and planning for raids on RIC barracks to seize weaponry continued regardless in a number of counties.

O'Malley took responsibility for organising over a dozen areas of the country from 1918–21. In visiting many parts of Ireland, both by bicycle and on foot, O'Malley carried much of what he owned, some 60 lb. weight including his books and notebooks.Hence he was obliged to be his own military base and commissariat. Nonetheless, he had very little money and was totally reliant on local people for his daily needs, including clothing.

Irish Republican Army
Although reporting officially to GHQ as a staff captain, O'Malley continued to act as a training officer for rural IRA brigades. This was a important duty: with minimal help from GHQ, he was to train recruits to become an effective local fighting force against a strong military opponent once the war against the British got under way in January 1919.

In mid-1919, O'Malley found himself in trouble with Collins for administering the new oath of allegiance to the Irish Republic to a company of IRA men in Santry, County Dublin. Collins had shown him the wording of this oath but it had not yet been officially approved by GHQ.

In February 1920, Eoin O'Duffy and O'Malley led an IRA attack on the RIC barracks in Ballytrain, County Monaghan. They were successful in taking it, one of the first captures of an RIC barracks in the war. This strategy had been developed by GHQ in early 1920 to acquire desperately needed arms and ammunition.

In early May, O'Malley was assigned by Collins to the Tipperary area at the request of Seamus Robinson and Sean Tracey. He participated actively in attacks on Hollyford (11 May), Drangan (4 June) and Rearcross (12 July). During these actions he had his hands burnt by a paraffin fire on the roof of Hollyford barracks, was nearly burnt alive by fire other than the wind changed direction at the very last second at Drangan and was wounded by shots fired upwards towards the roof by the RIC inside Rearcross barracks. These activities made him well known as a man of action with leadership qualities.

On 27 September, O'Malley and Liam Lynch led the Cork No. 2 Brigade in an attack against the military barracks in Mallow, County Cork. This successful attack saw the IRA capture large quantities of firearms and ammunition, partially burning the barracks in the process. In reprisal, soldiers went on a rampage in Mallow the next day.

In October, O'Malley served as a judge in the Republican Courts, recently established to undermine British rule.

Capture and escape
O'Malley was taken prisoner by Auxiliaries in the home of local IRA commandant James O'Hanrahan at Inistioge, County Kilkenny on the morning of 9 December 1920. He had been planning an attack on the Auxiliary barracks at Woodstock House, an important base in the southeast of the county that he knew to be well guarded. O'Malley had been given an automatic Webley revolver, however he was still unfamiliar with this new weapon and was unable to draw it in time to make possible his escape. He had displayed an uncharacteristic lack of care regarding O'Hanrahan's house being a likely British raiding target. Much to O'Malley's disgust, also seized were notebooks containing the names of members of the 7th West Kilkenny Brigade, all of whom were subsequently detained. At his arrest he gave his name as Bernard Stewart. O'Malley's arrest sheet records him as being from Roscommon and in possession of the loaded weapon and four maps.

O'Malley was badly beaten during his interrogation at Dublin Castle and, as a self-confessed IRA volunteer, was in severe danger of execution following recent high-profile attacks on British forces. By early January 1921, O'Malley was imprisoned in Kilmainham Gaol under the alias "Stewart".

Newspapers were forbidden there, but he was secretly given a copy of a newspaper article by someone who knew his real identity. It referred to a recent raid on a flat in Dawson St, Dublin, in which many papers had been taken away and the female occupant  of the flat arrested. That flat had been used by Michael Collins, some of whose papers were captured, while O'Malley had documents in a separate room.

The seizure of the latter papers led to a new name of interest to the British. By late January, a letter from Dublin Castle to senior British military authorities referred an IRA officer, a "notorious rebel" called "E. Malley", whom they were most anxious to arrest in connection with "many attacks on barracks". The letter asked about tracing this man's older brother Frank, then a British Army officer in East Africa, to see if he could provide any information on him. 

The IRA leadership was gravely concerned about O'Malley being executed, but thanks to a plan devised by Collins he managed to escape from Kilmainham Jail on 14 February 1921 along with IRA men Frank Teeling and Simon Donnelly. They were aided by two Welsh British Army soldier-guards who had republican sympathies.

Divisional commandant
In late March, he was summoned to a meeting in Dublin with the President of the Irish Republic Éamon de Valera, Collins and Mulcahy, where he was placed in command of the IRA's Second Southern Division in Munster ahead of more senior commanders in that province. With five brigades in Limerick, Kilkenny and Tipperary, it was the second-largest division in the IRA's new structure. As commandant-general of that division, O'Malley, not yet 24, now led more than 7,000 men.

On 19 June O'Malley and his unit captured three British Army officers and, citing the execution of IRA prisoners in Cork, O'Malley had the men shot the next day after promising to send their valuables to their comrades.

O'Malley was shocked when news reached him on 9 July that a truce would come into effect two days later. During the truce period in the second half of 1921, O'Malley felt that his state of preparedness for action in the county of Tipperary was getting better every day. O'Malley felt that while the British had control of the Cities and towns, they IRA had free reign over the countryside. 

The men under O'Malley's command initially thought the truce would only last for a few weeks, although it held as negotiations with the British gradually got underway. O'Malley was suspicious of the truce, but he used this time to work and strengthen his division, which saw visits from senior GHQ staff.

As munitions remained a problem. O'Malley went to London to purchase guns, where he met Collins during the treaty negotiations. While he was there, members of his division had stolen British weapons. This led to a high-level IRA inquiry, as the action represented a breach of the truce and could have imperilled the negotiations. All in all, O'Malley felt that the IRA was still preparing for war.

Civil War and aftermath

Opposition to the treaty
O'Malley opposed the Anglo-Irish Treaty) on the grounds that he felt any settlement that it fell short of an independent Irish Republic, particularly one backed up by British threats of restarting hostilities.

Moreover, he expressed clear opposition to the 'No. 2' document, created de Valera, which proposed an 'external association' with the British Empire as an alternative to the treaty. O'Malley's outright hostility to the treaty saw his division become the first to secede from GHQ, as he informed Mulcahy in person in mid-January 1922.

He was party to early meetings of what became known as the "Republican Military Council". In early April, he was appointed director of organisation for the anti-treaty headquarters staff. On 14 April, he was one of the Anti-Treaty IRA officers who occupied the Four Courts in Dublin, an event that helped to raise tensions prior to the start of the Irish Civil War. 

O'Malley was appointed to the executive committee of the IRA and was secretary to the IRA Convention. He repudiated any efforts at compromise with the pro-treaty side, made by some opponents of the treaty, as an attempt to create a wedge between republicans.
On 26 June, he suggested and carried out the kidnapping of Free State assistant chief of staff, J.J. "Ginger" O'Connell, and kept him prisoner in the Four Courts.

Outbreak of civil war

On 28 June, government forces bombarded the Four Courts. O'Malley was in the building when the historic Records Office was blown up during the advance by Free State troops on 30 June. That action cost him all the notes and manuals on training and tactics he had compiled and revised several times. Of that day he wrote in The Singing Flame: 
As we stood near the gate there was a loud shattering explosion … The munitions block and a portion of Headquarters block went up in flames and smoke … The yard was littered with chunks of masonry and smouldering records; pieces of white paper were gyrating in the upper air like seagulls. The explosion seemed to give an extra push to roaring orange flames which formed patterns across the sky. Fire was fascinating to watch; it had a spell like running water. Flame sang and conducted its own orchestra simultaneously. It can't be long now, I thought, until the real noise comes.

O'Malley, who assumed operational command of the Four Courts occupation after garrison commander Paddy O'Brien was injured by shrapnel, was ordered by his senior IRA commanders – over his objections – to surrender to the Free State Army on the afternoon of 30 June. That evening he escaped from temporary captivity in the Jameson Distillery along with future Taoiseach Seán Lemass and two others. The next day he travelled via the Wicklow Mountains to Blessington then County Wexford and finally County Carlow. This escape was probably fortunate for O'Malley, as four of the other senior Four Courts leaders were later executed.

Assistant chief of staff
On 10 July, O'Malley was made acting assistant chief of staff, effectively second in command, by Liam Lynch who had assumed the position of IRA chief of staff when the split in the republican ranks was healed on 27 June. He was also appointed as head of the Eastern and Northern Command, covering the provinces of Ulster and Leinster. O'Malley was disenchanted with being placed over areas he did not know well, instead of going to the west or south where his fighting experience would be put to much better use.

In September 1922, O'Malley pressed Lynch to implement Liam Mellows' proposed 10-Point Programme for the IRA, which would have seen them adopt Communist policies in an attempt to secure support from left-wing elements in Ireland. However, even if O'Malley thought highly of Mellows, there is nothing in his civil war-focused writings to indicate that he supported the Communist thrust of Mellows' programme.  

On an inspection of the North in October, O'Malley was in South Armagh when he joined Frank Aiken (commander of the IRA's 4th Northern Division) and Pádraig Ó Cuinn (quartermaster-general) for a planned assault on Free State positions in Dundalk. Designed to rescue IRA prisoners from earlier attacks by Aiken, this operation, however, turned out to be abortive.

O'Malley was forced to live a clandestine existence in Dublin, where he had to build up a new headquarters command staff. Moreover, effective military operations in the city were few and far between: O'Malley felt his men there lacked the spirit to carry out his orders, and he considered himself a glorified clerk. From the start, he was frustrated at being cooped up and seeing no action.

Lack of contact with Lynch was also a major problem: following a meeting of the IRA Executive on 15 July, none was held until 16–17 October. At that meeting Lynch informed O'Malley, to his relief, that Lynch would be moving his GHQ to Dublin and giving O'Malley command in the west; however, this did not happen. He also believed that Lynch's strategy of holding a defensive line in the south and locating IRA GHQ in County Cork made no sense: a concerted attack on Dublin should have been an early priority. This lack of ambition, he argued, demoralised both the IRA and its supporters, and allowed the "Staters" (the Irish Free State Army) to build up their strength in preparation for a gradual take-over of areas of the country dominated by "Irregulars" (the IRA). 

O'Malley expressed the view that to win the war, guerrilla tactics were insufficient. Rather, the anti-treaty side needed to use more conventional warfare, with larger columns to drive the enemy out of towns and villages. He stated to Lynch that the destruction of communications, unless part of an immediate military operation, was folly, as it discouraged fighting spirit. An uncoordinated struggle of scattered attrition, he wrote, was certain to lead to defeat.

Capture
O'Malley was captured again after a shoot-out with Free State soldiers at the family home of Nell Humphreys, 36 Ailesbury Rd, in the Donnybrook area of Dublin city on 4 November 1922. He was severely wounded in the incident, being hit over nine times (bullets remained lodged in his back for the remainder of his life). A Free State soldier was also killed in the gunfight. Anno O'Rahilly, who lived in the house, was accidentally shot by O'Malley during the raid.

Still severely affected by his wounds, O'Malley was transferred from Portobello military hospital to Mountjoy Prison hospital on 23 December 1922. As he made clear in The Singing Flame, he was in grave danger of being one of the many executed for armed insurrection against the state and, additionally in his case, for killing a soldier. O'Malley believed that the authorities were waiting for him to recover sufficiently for an "elaborate trial" to take place, a scenario in which he would refuse to recognise the court. Charges were preferred against him in January 1923.

A contemporary republican internee, Peadar O'Donnell, recorded that it was only the intervention of his doctors – who insisted that O'Malley was too ill even to be tried – that had saved him from court and execution. However, there also appeared to be official reservations about public and international reaction to shooting a man who would have to be carried to execution on a stretcher. This concern might have been heightened by the publication in the Irish newspapers, The Times and the New York Times, in January 1923, of reports about his severe condition. Ultimately, his trial was postponed indefinitely.

By February 1923, despite letters to the contrary, he felt that the anti-treaty side had been beaten since before Christmas, in which regard he acknowledged his own failure.

O'Malley's most important external contact from prison was his friend the American-born Irish nationalist Molly Childers, wife of Erskine who was executed soon after O'Malley's arrest. The two corresponded on many topics, with Childers sending O'Malley all kinds of goods and food parcels.

Hunger strike
The civil war ended with the cessation of hostilities and dumping of arms in May 1923, but most IRA prisoners were not released until much later. On 13 October, O'Malley and many others in Mountjoy Prison went on hunger strike for forty-one days, in protest at the continued detention of IRA prisoners (see 1923 Irish Hunger Strikes). After a week O'Malley and the other senior officers or elected members were moved to Kilmainham Jail. Against his will, he had already been nominated as a Sinn Féin candidate for Dublin North at the 1923 general election, held on 27 August, and was elected as a TD. O'Malley "hated" being a member of the Dáil.

In early January 1924, O'Malley was the last internee moved from Kilmainham. He was transferred to St Bricin's military hospital, thence to Mountjoy Prison hospital and later the general prison. There then came a move to the Curragh camp hospital in late winter before he was placed in a regular hut. By mid-1924, the Free State government heard strong calls in parliament for the release of the final 600-odd anti-treaty prisoners, in the interests of restoring a more normal state of affairs. Further pressure came from the organisers of the Tailteann Games, which were expected to be attended in early August by tens of thousands of overseas visitors.

Despite official reservations, the prisoners began to be set free, and O'Malley was the very last anti-treaty internee to be released. He was released from the Curragh, along with Seán Russell, on 17 July 1924, well over a year after the end of hostilities.

Secretary to IRA Executive
Upon his release, O'Malley worked as the Secretary to the IRA Executive. He attended a meeting of the executive on 10–11 August 1924 at which de Valera and almost all the IRA hierarchy were present. O'Malley was one of a sub-committee of five appointed to act as an 'army council' to the Executive. He also proposed a motion, passed unanimously, that IRA members must refuse to recognise courts in the Free State or Six Counties for charges relating to actions committed during the war or to political activities since then. Further, a legal defence would only be permitted if the death penalty might be imposed. Yet his military career was over and he remained aloof from politics. O'Malley stayed with Sinn Féin and did not join Fianna Fáil in 1926, nor did he contest the June 1927 general election.

During the Civil war, three of O'Malley's younger brothers, Cecil, Paddy and Kevin, were arrested by Free State troops in July 1922. Another younger brother Charlie, also anti-treaty, died on 4 July 1922 in O'Connell Street during the Battle of Dublin. In all, O'Malley suffered more than a dozen wounds from 1916 to 1923.

Subsequent life

Europe 
O'Malley left Ireland in February 1925 and spent 18 months travelling in Europe to improve his health. He used the alias 'Cecil Edward Smyth-Howard' and secured a British passport in that name.

While abroad in the 1920s, O'Malley had connections with the Basque Country and Catalan nationalists, becoming acquainted with Francesc Macià, leader of the Catalan nationalist group Estat Català. The following excerpt from a letter from O'Malley to Harriet Monroe, dated 10 January 1935, provides an autobiographical summary of the years 1925-1926:

I went to Catalonia to help the Catalan movement for independence; I studied their folklore and cultural institutions. I learned to walk again in the Pyrénées. I became a good mountain climber, covered the frontier from San Sebastian to Perpignan, lived in the Basque country. I walked through a part of Spain, southern and South East France and most of Italy. I did some mediaeval history at Grenoble. I walked through Italy slowly, worked at archeology in Sicily and lived in Rome and Florence for a time. I walked through Germany to Holland and through Belgium and then to North Africa. After some years I returned to the National University to again take up medicine but I did not get my exams. The years abroad taught me to use my eyes in a new way.

O'Malley was known to French intelligence as a "chief military adviser to Colonel Macià", who was then in exile in Paris. O'Malley likewise appears to have liaised with Basque nationalists around this same period, as they were planning a rebellion in tandem with that of the Catalans. O'Malley was one of two Irish republicans, the other being Ambrose Victor Martin, to have cooperated with the Basque and Catalan nationalists resident in Paris, then exiled from the Spanish dictatorship of Miguel Primo de Rivera.

North America 
O'Malley returned to UCD to continue his medical studies in October 1926, but these did not progress well. He was heavily involved in the university hill-walking club and its literary and historical societies. Along with literary friends, he founded the UCD Dramatic Society.

However, O'Malley left Ireland again in October 1928 without graduating. For eight months in 1928 and 1929, he and Frank Aiken toured the east and west coasts of the USA on behalf of de Valera's plan to raise funds for the establishment of the new, independent pro-republican newspaper,  The Irish Press. O'Malley considered a newspaper that would articulate the anti-treaty position an important development.

O'Malley spent the next few years based in New Mexico, Mexico and New York. In September 1929, he arrived in Taos, New Mexico. He lived among the literary and artistic community there and close to the Native American pueblo of Taos. He began work on his account of his military experiences that would later become On Another Man's Wound. At that time he fell in with Mabel Dodge Luhan, Dorothy Brett and Irish poet Ella Young. In May 1930, he moved to Santa Fe, where he gave lectures on Irish culture, history and literature.

In 1931, he travelled to Mexico for eight months observing its culture and artists. However, he failed to secure employment as he had hoped. His US visa having expired, he reputedly swam across the Rio Grande and returned to Santa Fe. For the winter months of early 1932, O'Malley worked in Taos as a tutor to the children of deceased leading Irish-American Peter Golden, when his widowed wife was hospitalised and local schools had been closed. During this period he became good friends with photographer Paul Strand. In June 1932, he travelled to New York, where in 1933 he met 28-year-old Helen Hooker, a wealthy young sculptor and gifted tennis player, whom he was later to marry.

Return to Ireland 
In 1934, O'Malley was granted a wound and war pension of approximately £330 a year by the Fianna Fáil government for his service in the Irish War of Independence. In June of that year, it was noted in the Dáil that he was rumoured to be coming back into public life as chief of staff of the Volunteer Force created by the Fianna Fáil government in April.

Now possessed of a steady income, he married Hooker in London on 27 September 1935, before he returned to Ireland to resume his medical studies. The O'Malleys had three children and divided their time between Dublin and Burrishoole, Newport, County Mayo. Hooker and O'Malley devoted themselves to the arts: she was involved in sculpture, photography and theatre, while he pursued a career in history and the arts as a writer. O'Malley remained in neutral Ireland during The Emergency. He offered his services to but was rejected by his local security force. By the end of the war years the O'Malleys' marriage had begun to fail.

After 1945, Helen O'Malley went to America for six months to see her family and thereafter began to spend more time independent of her husband and children. This period included a year in London in 1946–47. After 1948 she returned to the States.  1946, O'Malley entered his sons for a place at an English Catholic public school, Ampleforth College, in Yorkshire. In 1950, Helen took her two elder children out of school in County Waterford to live with her, first in New York, then in Colorado, where she divorced her husband in 1952. The youngest child, Cormac, was not at school and thus stayed with his father.

In 1951, O'Malley acted as a special adviser to John Ford on the set of The Quiet Man and the two became firm friends.

Illness and death 
Throughout his life, O'Malley endured considerable ill-health from the wounds and hardship he had suffered during his revolutionary days. His main weakness, however, was a heart condition that started in childhood. His brother, Kevin, a heart specialist, took care of him in later years, especially after O'Malley suffered a serious heart attack in spring 1953.

Ernie O"Malley died at 9.20 a.m. on Monday 25 March 1957 at his sister Kaye's home in Howth. Contrary to his wishes, he was given a state funeral by the newly elected Fianna Fáil government. It was attended by many of the deceased's comrades from all over Ireland, including Dan Breen. President Seán T. O'Kelly, Lemass, de Valera and Aiken were also present. Sean Moylan delivered the graveside oration while O'Malley's children and ex-wife looked on.

Writings
On 1928, in a letter to fellow republican Sheila Humphreys, O'Malley explained his attitude to writing:I have the bad and disagreeable habit of writing the truth as I see it, and not as other people (including yourself) realise it, in which we are a race of spiritualised idealists with a world idea of freedom, having nothing to learn for we have made no mistakes.

O'Malley's most celebrated writings are On Another Man's Wound, a memoir of the War of Independence, and its sequel, The Singing Flame, a continuing memoir of his involvement in the Civil War. These two volumes were written during O'Malley's time in New York, New Mexico and Mexico between 1929 and 1932. However, O'Malley's son, Cormac, also notes that On Another Man's Wound required seven years from start to finish before it was finally published. The work was ready for publication by 1932, but it was rejected by no fewer than thirteen American publishers. Thus, O'Malley had to wait until his return to Ireland in 1935 for the book to be considered by other publishers.

On Another Man's Wound was published in London and Dublin in 1936, although the seven pages detailing O'Malley's ill-treatment while under arrest in Dublin Castle were omitted. An unabridged version was published in America a year later under the title Army Without Banners: Adventures of an Irish Volunteer. The New York Times described it as "a stirring and beautiful account of a deeply felt experience", while the New York Herald Tribune called it "a tale of heroic adventure told without rancor or rhetoric". The book was a success and went down well with O'Malley's former comrades.

In an article in The Irish Times in 1996, the writer John McGahern described On Another Man's Wound as "the one classic work to have emerged directly from the violence that led to independence", adding that it "deserves a permanent and honoured place in our literature."

While the book was acclaimed internationally, not everyone was thrilled with it. A former IRA colleague, Joseph O'Doherty from Donegal, sued O'Malley for libel. This led to a court case in 1937, which O'Malley lost. It cost him £400 in damages, a substantial sum well over his annual pension.

Perhaps reflecting its more controversial theme in Ireland, The Singing Flame was not published until 1978, over 20 years after O'Malley's death. Moreover, O'Malley's own lack of knowledge of the civil war as a whole had required him to carry out some years of research right into the 1950s. He undertook 450 interviews of his comrades over a five-year period in the late 1940s and early 1950s.

Based on his interviews, he prepared a series of talks he gave on Radio Éireann in 1953, which were highly popular. These in turn led to his 'IRA Raids' serial in The Sunday Press from 1955 to 1956. This series of articles was then consolidated and published as a book, Raids and Rallies, in 1982.

After his research O'Malley wrote a biography of Longford republican and fellow organiser Seán Connolly. It was discovered and published in 2007 as Rising-Out: Seán Connolly of Longford.

In 2012, a series entitled The Men Will Talk to Me: Ernie O'Malley's Interviews was initiated and has covered those he made in Kerry, Galway, Mayo, Clare, Cork and with the Northern Divisions. His official military and personal papers on the civil war were published in 2007, under the title, "No Surrender Here!" The Civil War Papers of Ernie O'Malley, 1922–1924. His personal letters were published in 2011 as Broken Landscapes: Selected Letters of Ernie O'Malley, 1924–1957.

O'Malley wrote and published some poetry in Poetry magazine (Chicago) in 1935 and 1936, and in the Dubliner Magazine in 1935. From 1946 to 1948, he also contributed, as books editor, to the literary and cultural magazine, The Bell, edited by his old comrade Peadar O'Donnell. O'Malley also gathered ballads and stories from the revolutionary period; and during World War II, he noted down over 300 traditionary folktales from his native area near Clew Bay in Mayo. O'Malley wrote many as yet unpublished works of poetry, vignettes, essays and his 1926 experiences in the Pyrenees. There also exist his extensive diaries, especially from his travels in Europe, New Mexico and Mexico.

Legacy
O'Malley firmly believed that Ireland, having been on the receiving end of an occupying power for so long, deserved to rule itself. Achieving that aim was the sole, almost overwhelming, focus of his early adult years.

O'Malley made a significant contribution to making IRA volunteers, often poorly armed, into a formidable guerrilla force. Sean Lemass considered him an exceptional military commander. However, Tom Barry, who was passed over for the divisional command given to O'Malley, felt that the latter paid too much heed to the military manual.

O'Malley's literary output, as well as the research he undertook in his later years, resulted in his being portrayed by Frances-Mary Blake as the "historian of the resistance". O'Malley's work filled a gap the historiography of the Irish revolutionary period that mostly overlooked the activities of local leaders and their men. In that regard, his voluminous civil war output is "unrivalled".

O'Malley was uncomfortable with being addressed as "General" once he ceased being a soldier. While he had been an opponent of his adversaries in the War of Independence and Civil War, and retained his uncompromising republican beliefs until the day he died, he bore no ill will towards anyone in his later years.

O'Malley may have felt that he was "hated thoroughly" by the men he had trained, on account of the demands he had made of them. When he died in 1957, five of the many bullets he had received in numerous actions remained in his body.

For all the above reasons, O'Malley is assessed by Richard English as remaining an important figure in a "fractious period" of 20th-century Irish history.

A sculpture of Manannán mac Lir, donated in his memory by Helen Hooker, stands in the Mall in Castlebar, County Mayo.

A documentary film on O'Malley's life, On Another Man's Wound: Scéal Ernie O'Malley, was made for TG4 television by Jerry O'Callaghan in 2008. A Call to Arts, a documentary about the artistic journey of Helen Hooker and Ernie O'Malley, was produced by Cormac O'Malley and directed by Chris Kepple in 2020. It was shown on Connecticut Public Television (2020) and RTÉ (2021).

Ernie O'Malley's memoirs are the main inspiration behind the Ken Loach 2006 film The Wind that Shakes the Barley, and the character of Damien Donovan is based loosely on O'Malley.

Notes

References

Bibliography

Writings
 Ernie O'Malley (1936). On Another Man's Wound (revised edition 2002, expanded edition containing all of the author's original corrections and revisions 2013)
 Ernie O'Malley (1978). The Singing Flame. ISBN 978-0-947962-32-6 (second edition 1992, revised and expanded edition 2012)
 Ernie O'Malley (1982). Raids and Rallies (revised edition 2011)
 Ernie O'Malley (2007). Rising-Out: Seán Connolly of Longford
 Ernie O'Malley et al. (2007). "No Surrender Here!": The Civil War Papers of Ernie O'Malley 1922–1924
 Ernie O'Malley (2011). Broken Landscapes: Selected Letters of Ernie O'Malley, 1924–1957
 Ernie O'Malley (2012–2018). The Men Will Talk to Me: Ernie O'Malley's Interviews
 Ernie O'Malley (2017). Nobody's Business: The Aran Diaries of Ernie O'Malley
 Ernie O'Malley (2021). I Call My Soul My Own: Ernie O'Malley and Dorothy Stewart in New Mexico, 1929–1930

Secondary sources
 Padraic O'Farrell (1983). The Ernie O'Malley Story (Cork, Mercier Press)
 Richard English (1988). Ernie O'Malley: IRA Intellectual (Oxford, OUP)
 Richard English and Cormac O'Malley (ed.) (1991). Prisoners. The Civil War Letters of Ernie O'Malley (Dublin, Poolbeg Press)
 Mary Cosgrove (2005). 'Ernie O'Malley: Art and Modernism in Ireland'. Éire-Ireland, Fall–Winter 2005, 85–103.
 Cormac O'Malley (ed.) (2016). Modern Ireland and Revolution: Ernie O'Malley in Context (Newbridge, IAP)
 Harry F. Martin with Cormac K. H. O'Malley (2021). Ernie O'Malley: A Life (Newbridge, IAP)

Further reading
Cormac O'Malley and Juliet Christy Barron (2015). Western Ways: Remembering Mayo Through the Eyes of Helen Hooker and Ernie O'Malley (Dublin, Mercier Press).

External links
Ernie O'Malley: Soldier, Writer, Artist – the official website maintained by his son, Cormac O'Malley (ernieomalley.com)
Papers of Ernie O'Malley, UCD Archives
Ernie O'Malley Papers at Tamiment Library and Robert F. Wagner Labor Archives at New York University

1897 births
1957 deaths
Early Sinn Féin TDs
Irish Republican Army (1919–1922) members
Irish Republican Army (1922–1969) members
Irish non-fiction writers
Irish male non-fiction writers
Members of the 4th Dáil
Military personnel from County Mayo
People from Castlebar
People of the Irish Civil War (Anti-Treaty side)
Politicians from County Mayo
20th-century non-fiction writers